Košarkaški klub FMP, commonly referred to as KK FMP or as FMP Meridian due to sponsorship reasons, is a men's professional basketball club based in Belgrade, Serbia. The club plays in the ABA League, the Basketball League of Serbia, and the Basketball Champions League. Their home arena is the Železnik Hall.

The club was founded in Novi Sad in 1970 as KK Radnički, and was later relocated to Belgrade. The club considers itself as the successor of the 'original' FMP.

History

The Radnički era (1970–2013)

1970–2009: Based in Novi Sad 
The club was formed in 1970 as KK Radnički from Novi Sad. The club had played in regional leagues until 2006, when new sponsors onboard, Invest Inženjering and Park Hotel. The club moved to the top-tier Serbian League in 2007 and played in that competition in their last two seasons (2007–08 and 2008–09). During the 2008–09 season, guard Zlatko Bolić led the league with 22.8 points per game.

2009–2013: Based in Belgrade 

In 2009, Radnički was relocated to Belgrade and changed its name to KK Radnički Basket to distinguish it from well-known Radnički Belgrade. Two years later, the club changed its name to KK Radnički FMP.

FMP (2013–present) 
In the 2016–17 season, FMP made a debut in the ABA League and finished in 9th place in the end of the season. Power forward Jonah Bolden was awarded the ABA League Top Prospect title after averaging 12.9 points and 7.2 rebounds per game in his rookie season.

In December 2020, the club became a shareholder of the Adriatic Basketball Association, following a transfer of shares from Metalac Valjevo. On 18 November 2021, the club changed its name to FMP Meridian for the 2021–22 season due to sponsorship reasons. In June 2022, FMP confirmed to join the Basketball Champions League for the 2022–23 season, hosting a qualifying round in Belgrade.

Names of the club

Sponsorship naming 
The club has had several denominations through the years due to its sponsorship: 
 Radnički Invest Inženjering (2006–2009)
 FMP Meridian (2021–present)

Logos

Home arenas

 SPC Vojvodina, Novi Sad (2006–2009)
 Belgrade Basket City, Belgrade (2009–2011) 
 Železnik Hall, Belgrade (2011–present)

Players

Current roster

Players with multiple nationalities
   Charles Jenkins
   Milutin Vujičić
   Andrija Vuković

Depth chart

Coaches

Radnički Novi Sad (1970–2009)

 Mladen Mikić (2006–2008)
 Velislav Vesković (2008–2009)
Radnički Basket/Radnički FMP (2009–2013)
 Dragan Vaščanin (2009)
 Boško Đokić (2009–2010)
 Miloš Pejić (2010–2013)

FMP (2013–present)
 Milan Gurović (2013–2015)
 Slobodan Klipa (2015–2016)
 Branko Maksimović (2016–2017)
 Dušan Alimpijević (2017)
 Vladimir Jovanović (2017–2020)
 Bojan Đerić (2020–2021)
 Vanja Guša (2021)
 Nenad Stefanović (2021–present)

Season-by-season

Trophies and awards

Trophies 

Serbian League
Runners-up (3): 2016–17, 2017–18, 2021–22
Serbian B League (2nd-tier)
Winner (1): 2006–07
Runners-up (1): 2010–11
Radivoj Korać Cup
Semifinals  (4): 2014, 2017, 2018, 2019
League Cup of Serbia (2nd-tier)
Winner (4): 2009–10, 2010–11, 2011–12, 2015–16
Runners-up (2): 2012–13, 2013–14

Since 2013, the club considers itself a successor of the "original" FMP and in that sense incorporates the trophies won by that club. Trophies are:
FR Yugoslavia Cup winner: 1 (1996–97)
Radivoj Korać Cup winner: 3 (2002–03, 2004–05, 2006–07)
Adriatic League champion: 2 (2003–04, 2005–06)

Individual awards
Super League MVP Award (1):
  Miloš Dimić – 2011–12
Basketball League of Serbia Top Scorer (1):
  Zlatko Bolić – 2008–09
Adriatic League Top Prospect (1):
  Jonah Bolden – 2017

Notable players

Radnički Novi Sad (1970–2009)
  Zlatko Bolić
  Stevan Karadžić

Radnički Basket/Radnički FMP (2009–2013)
  Miloš Dimić
  Nikola Rebić
  Dušan Ristić

FMP (2013–present)

  Jonah Bolden
  Isaac Humphries
  Duop Reath
  Paulius Valinskas
  Bojan Subotić
  Michael Ojo
  Finn Delany
  Jurij Macura
  Matic Rebec
  Dragan Apić
  Filip Čović
  Dejan Davidovac
  Ognjen Dobrić
  Ilija Đoković
  Radovan Đoković
  Stefan Đorđević
  Marko Gudurić
  Marko Jeremić
  Ognjen Kuzmić
  Sava Lešić
  Stefan Pot
  Aleksa Radanov
  Marko Radovanović
  Boriša Simanić
  Radoš Šešlija
  Aleksa Uskoković
  Okben Ulubay
  Bryce Jones
  Trent Frazier
  Charles Jenkins

International record

References

External links

Profile at eurobasket.com

KK FMP
Basketball teams in Belgrade
Sport in Novi Sad
Basketball teams in Yugoslavia
Basketball teams established in 1970
1970 establishments in Serbia